When We Were 21 is a 1921 American silent comedy drama film directed by Henry King and starring H.B. Warner, Claire Anderson, and James Morrison.

Cast
 H.B. Warner as Richard Carewe 
 Claire Anderson as Phyllis 
 James Morrison as Richard Audaine 
 Christine Mayo as Kara Glynesk 
 Claude Payton as Dave 
 Minna Grey as Mrs. Ericson

References

Bibliography
 Donald W. McCaffrey & Christopher P. Jacobs. Guide to the Silent Years of American Cinema. Greenwood Publishing, 1999.

External links

1921 films
1921 comedy-drama films
Films directed by Henry King
American silent feature films
1920s English-language films
American black-and-white films
Pathé Exchange films
1920s American films
Silent American comedy-drama films